The 2015 V8 Supercar season was the nineteenth year in which V8 Supercars contested the senior Australian touring car series. It was the 56th year of touring car racing in Australia since the first runnings of the Australian Touring Car Championship, now known as the International V8 Supercars Championship, and the fore-runner of the present day Bathurst 1000, the Armstrong 500.

The season began on 26 February at the Adelaide Street Circuit and finished on 6 December at the Homebush Street Circuit. 2015 featured the nineteenth V8 Supercar Championship, consisting of 36 races at 14 events covering all six states and the Northern Territory of Australia as well as an event in New Zealand. There was also a stand-alone event supporting the 2015 Australian Grand Prix. The season also featured the sixteenth second-tier Dunlop V8 Supercar Series, contested over seven rounds. For the eighth time a third-tier series was run, the Kumho Tyres V8 Touring Car Series.

The series championships were won by Mark Winterbottom (V8 Supercar Championship), Cameron Waters (Dunlop Series) and Liam McAdam (Kumho KVTC) respectively.

Race calendar
Dates sourced from:

IVC – International V8 Supercar Championship
DVS – Dunlop V8 Supercar Series
KVTC – Kumho Tyres V8 Touring Car Series
NC – Non-championship

International V8 Supercars Championship

So Dick Johnson Racing Became DJR Team Penske

Dunlop V8 Supercar Series

MSS Security V8 Supercars Challenge

References

External links
 

Supercar seasons